The Killer (Le Tueur) is a French comic book by writer Matz and artist Luc Jacamon which follows the life of an initially unnamed assassin.

Publication history
The series was published in 12 albums by Casterman. It was translated into English and published by Archaia Studios Press, who turned each album into 2 comic books.

Publications

The French albums from Casterman are:
 Long feu (October 1998)
 L'engrenage (April 2000)
 La dette (August 2001)
 Les liens du sang (August 2002)
 La mort dans l’âme (October 2003)
 Modus Vivendi (September 2007)
 Le commun des mortels (August 2009)
 L'ordre naturel des choses (June 2010)
 Concurrence déloyale (March 2011)
 Le cœur à l'ouvrage (January 2012)
 La suite dans les idées (January 2013)
 La main qui nourrit (November 2013)

Collected editions
Volume One (collects The Killer #1-4: "Long Fire" and "Vicious Cycle", hardcover, 128 pages, September 2007)

Volume Two (collects The Killer #5-10: "The Debt", "Blood Ties", and "The Killer Instinct", hardcover, 176 pages, March 2010)

Volume Three (collects: "Modus Vivendi", "Ordinary Mortals" and "The Natural Order Of Things", hardcover, 176 pages, February 2011)

Volume Four (collects: "Unfair Competition", and "Putting Your Heart In It", hardcover, 128 pages, April 2013)

Volume Five (collects: "One Track Mind", and "Fight or flight", hardcover, 128 pages, February 2017)

Awards
The Volume One collected edition won "Best Indy Book" in IGN's Best of 2007. The edition also won "Best Comic You Didn’t Read This Year" from Newsarama and was nominated for "Best U.S. Edition of International Material" in the 2008 Eisner Awards.

Film adaptation
The series is being made into a film by Paramount Pictures which will be directed by David Fincher. In February 2021, it was announced that Fincher has moved the project to Netflix with news that Andrew Kevin Walker will write the script. Michael Fassbender is in talks to star in the film. Production began in November 2021. Tilda Swinton will costar.

Notes

References

Le Tueur at Bedetheque

External links
 Matz at Casterman
 The Killer at the official Archaia Studios Press website.
 Preview of The Killer #1
 Review of The Killer
 The Complete The Killer: The Craft of Pasting Ethics Over Action

Interviews
 Matz Narks on The Killer, The Pulse, Comicon.com, June 6, 2006

Works about Colombian drug cartels